Kindelan is a surname of Irish origin that has been adopted into Spanish.

The extended Kindelan Family originated in Ireland and hosted a clan gathering there in August 2013 and in 2015 in Cordoba. Up to the mid-18th century it was common for Irish citizens to enroll in the Irish Brigades of Spain or France, individuals being known as "wild geese"; this was especially so after the Treaty of Limerick which ended the Williamite War.

About 1700 (date uncertain), Michael Kindelan (born 1674 in Ballinakill–died 1720)  married Cecelia Lutrell of Luttrellstown near Dublin; their son Vincent was born at Castle Ricard, County Meath in 1710.

Vincent (Vicente) became one of these wild geese and fathered both Sebastian and Juan in the 1750s in Spain. He married Maria Francisca O'Regan y MacManus, daughter of Mauricio O'Regan and Rosa MacManus, on 15 Apr 1741 in Fraga. Vincent is credited as the forebear of all the Spanish Kindelans, and of many in the Americas.

People
 Alfredo Kindelán (1879 - 1962), a Spanish general and politician
 Jean de Kindelán, (1759 - 1822) Spanish army officer in service of Napoleon
 Mario Kindelán, a Cuban boxer
 Orestes Kindelán, a Cuban baseball player
 Sebastián Kindelán y O’Regan (1757–1826) Governor of East Florida, Dominican Republic and Cuba

References

Surnames
Spanish-language surnames
Surnames of Irish origin